Northwick is a hamlet in South Gloucestershire, England, first mentioned in 955.

The hamlet lies on the River Severn, between Pilning and Aust.  It was part of the tything of Northwick with Redwick in the ancient parish of Henbury.  It is now in the parish of Pilning and Severn Beach.

The church of St Thomas was declared redundant in 1971.

External links 

Extract from National Gazetteer, 1868

Villages in South Gloucestershire District